The Epona Stakes is an Australian Turf Club Group 3 Thoroughbred horse race, for fillies and mares aged three years old and upwards, over a distance of 1900 metres, with set weights and penalties, held annually at Rosehill Racecourse in Sydney, Australia in March. Total prize money for the race is A$200,000.

History

The race has its origins as an undercard race for the Golden Slipper Stakes race meeting at Rosehill in 1998. The name changed to the Epona Mares Quality Plate the following year, named after the Celtic-Roman god for the protector of horses, Epona. By 2001 the race became registered and a black type race as the Epona Stakes. In 2012 the race was upgraded to Group 3.

Name
1998 - Mares Plate
1999–2000 - Epona Mares Quality Plate
2001 - Epona Mares Quality Stakes
2002 - The Brookvale Hotel Stakes
2003–2004 - Berjani Jewellers Stakes
2005–2006 - Epona Stakes
2007–2011 - De Bortoli Wines Stakes
2012–2013 - Epona Stakes
2014 - Percy Sykes Tribute Stakes  
2015 onwards - Epona Stakes

Venue
1998–1999 - Rosehill
2000–2002 - Canterbury
2003 onwards  - Rosehill

Distance
1998–1999 – 2000 metres
2000 onwards - 1900 metres

Grade

1998–2000 - unlisted
2001–2011 - Listed race
2012 onwards - Group 3

Winners

 2023 - Gin Martini
 2022 - Monegal
 2021 - Polly Grey
 2020 - Missybeel
 2019 - Semari
 2018 - The Pinnacle
 2017 - Consommateur
 2016 - Vergara
 2015 - Scratchy Bottom
2014 - Intimate Moment
2013 - Aliyana Tilde
2012 - Fibrillation
2011 - Galizani 
2010 - Messenger 
2009 - Divine Rebel 
2008 - Ready To Lift 
2007 - Safwa 
2006 - Kosi Bay  
2005 - Natural Woman  
2004 - Great Anna 
2003 - Airlie Bird 
2002 - Ilze 
2001 – Market Price 
2000 - Our Erin 
1999 - Zastov  
1998 - Burning Embers

See also
List of Australian Group races
Group races

External links 
First three placegetters Epona Stakes (ATC)

References

Horse races in Australia